The Jeebropilly Mine is an open pit coal mine in the Moreton Basin near Amberley in South East Queensland. The mine is owned by New Hope Coal.

The mine ceased operations after 25 years of extraction in February 2007. The mine's closure left one operating mine in Ipswich. To offset the loss of production from Jeebropilly Mine, New Hope expanded mining at the New Acland Mine. The coal-washing plant at Jeebropilly continued to operate so that coal from New Oakleigh Mine could be processed.

The mine was recommissioned in 2008 due to high export prices for coal.

See also

Coal Mining in Australia

References

Coal mines in Queensland
Surface mines in Australia
South East Queensland